Agdistis kenyana is a moth in the family Pterophoridae. It is known from Kenya and Tanzania.

References

Agdistinae
Moths described in 1988
Moths of Africa
Insects of Tanzania